Filodrillia aikeni is a species of sea snails, a marine gastropod mollusc in the family Borsoniidae.

Description

Distribution
This marine species occurs off the Eastern Cape, South Africa

References

 Stahlschmidt P. (2015). Description of three new turrid species (Gastropoda: Conoidea) from South Africa. Miscellanea Malacologica. 7(1): 13-18. page(s): 14, figs 7-9

Endemic fauna of South Africa
aikeni
Gastropods described in 2015
Invertebrates of South Africa